McGray is a surname. Notable people with the surname include:

Asa McGray (1780–1843), Canadian Free Will Baptist minister 
Michael Wayne McGray (born 1965), Canadian serial killer
Nehemiah McGray (1838–1887), Canadian ship's captain, merchant, and politician, grandson of Asa McGray